Collignoniceratidae is a family of Upper Cretaceous ammonites characterized by typically more or less evolute shells with  compressed, oval, or square whorl sections; serrate or entire keels; and dense ribs with one to 5 tubercles.

Taxonomy
This family, named by Wright and Wright in 1951, is divided into four subfamilies; Collignoniceratinae, Barroisiceratinae, Peroniceratinae, and Texanitinae.  The family is included in the large ammonitid superfamily Acanthoceratoidea which lasted until the end of the Cretaceous.

The Collignoniceratidae are derived from the Acanthoceratidae, first appearing early in the Turonian (early U Cret) and lasting until the mid Campanian (late U Cret), a span of some 20 million years

Collignoniceratidae Wright & Wright, 1951 (synonyms - Prionocyclidae Breistroffer, 1947; Prionotropidae Zittel, 1865)
Subfamily Barroisiceratinae Basse, 1947
Genus Barroisiceras de Grossouvre, 1894
Genus Forresteria (Reeside, 1932)
Genus Solgerites Reeside, 1932
Genus Yabeiceras Tokunaga & Shimizu, 1926
Subfamily Collignoniceratinae Wright & Wright, 1951
Genus Cibolaites Cobban & Hook, 1983
Genus Collignoniceras Breistroffer, 1947
Genus Collignonicerites Kennedy et al., 2001
Genus Prionocyclites Kennedy, 1988
Genus Prionocyclus Meek, 1876
Genus Reesidites Wright & Matsumoto, 1954
Genus Subprionotropis Basse, 1950
Subfamily Peroniceratinae Hyatt, 1900
Genus Gauthiericeras de Grossouvre, 1894
Genus Peroniceras de Grossouvre, 1894
Genus Prionocycloceras Spath, 1926
Subfamily Texanitinae Collignon, 1948
Genus Bevahites Collignon, 1948
Genus Cryptotexanites Kennedy & Cobban, 1993
Genus Menabites Collignon, 1948
Genus Paratexanites Collignon, 1948
Genus Plesiotexanites Matsumoto, 1970
Genus Protexanites Matsumoto, 1955
Genus Reginaites Reyment, 1957
Genus Submortoniceras Spath, 1926
Genus Texanites Spath, 1932

References
 Arkell et al., 1957,  Mesozoic Ammonoidea, Treatise on Invertebrate Paleontology Part L.  Geological Soc. of America, Univ of Kansas Press. R.C. Moore, (Ed)
 W. A. Cobban and Hook, S. C. 1983 Mid-Cretaceous (Turonian) ammonite fauna from Fence Lake area of west-central New Mexico.  Memoir 41, New Mexico Bureau of Mines & Mineral Resources, Socorro NM.
 W. A. Cobban and Hook, S. C. 1979, Collignoniceras woollgari wooollgari (Mantell) ammonite fauna from Upper Cretaceous of Western Interior,  United States.  Memoir 37, New Mexico Bureau of Mines & Mineral Resources, Socorro NM.

 
Ammonitida families
Acanthoceratoidea
Cretaceous ammonites
Turonian first appearances
Campanian extinctions